Crystal Springs Air Force Station is a closed United States Air Force General Surveillance Radar station.  It is located in Crystal Springs, Mississippi.  It was closed in 1968.

Crystal Springs Air Force Station came into existence as part of Phase III of the Air Defense Command Mobile Radar program. On October 20, 1953 ADC requested a third phase of twenty-five radar sites be constructed.

History

The 627th Aircraft Control and Warning Squadron was assigned on 1 September 1958 and began testing the AN/FPS-27 frequency-diversified search radar. During 1959 Crystal Springs AFS joined the Semi Automatic Ground Environment (SAGE) system, initially feeding data to DC-09 at Gunter AFB, Alabama.  After joining, the squadron was re-designated as the 627th Radar Squadron (SAGE) on 1 October 1959.  The radar squadron provided information 24/7 the SAGE Direction Center where it was analyzed to determine range, direction altitude speed and whether or not aircraft were friendly or hostile.

In addition to the main facility, Crystal Springs operated an AN/FPS-14 Gap Filler site:
 Summit, MS  (TM-195A): 

Two height-finder radars, types AN/FPS-6A and AN/FPS-90, were also installed in the early 1960s. The 627th Radar Squadron was inactivated on 6 September 1968 and Crystal Springs AFS was closed due to a draw-down of ADC and budget constraints.  The site has been turned into a Job Corps training center by the State of Mississippi.   Most of the former USAF buildings remain along with base housing.  The radar tower footprints are still visible in aerial photography.

See also
 List of USAF Aerospace Defense Command General Surveillance Radar Stations

References

  A Handbook of Aerospace Defense Organization 1946 - 1980,  by Lloyd H. Cornett and Mildred W. Johnson, Office of History, Aerospace Defense Center, Peterson Air Force Base, Colorado
 Winkler, David F. (1997), Searching the skies: the legacy of the United States Cold War defense radar program. Prepared for United States Air Force Headquarters Air Combat Command.
 Crystal Springs AFS, MS

External links

Semi-Automatic Ground Environment sites
Installations of the United States Air Force in Mississippi
Aerospace Defense Command military installations
1958 establishments in Mississippi
1968 disestablishments in Mississippi
Military installations established in 1958
Military installations closed in 1968